Alexeyevka is a town in Belgorod Oblast, Russia, located on the Tikhaya Sosna River (Don's basin)  east of Belgorod. Population:

History

It was founded in 1685 as Alexeyevka (or Alexeyevskaya) sloboda, named after Alexey Cherkassky, its first owner. Town status was granted to it in 1954.

Administrative and municipal status
Within the framework of administrative divisions, Alexeyevka serves as the administrative center of Alexeyevsky District, even though it is not a part of it. As an administrative division, it is incorporated separately as the town of oblast significance of Alexeyevka—an administrative unit with the status equal to that of the districts. As a municipal division, the town of oblast significance of Alexeyevka is incorporated within Alexeyevsky Municipal District as Alexeyevka Urban Settlement.

References

Notes

Sources

External links

 
Directory of organizations in Alexeyevka 

Cities and towns in Belgorod Oblast
Biryuchensky Uyezd